Enough Said is a 2013 film with Julia Louis-Dreyfus and James Gandolfini.

Enough Said may also refer to:

 Enough Said!, a 1959 album by Bill Jennings
 "Enough Said" (song), a 2012 song by Aaliyah, released posthumously
 "Enough Said", a song by Devo from New Traditionalists

See also
 Nuff Said (disambiguation)
 Enough (disambiguation)